Zulkifli Zainal Abidin  is a Malaysian general who served as the 20th Chief of Defence Forces. He served as the Chief of Army from June 14, 2011 to June 13, 2013.

Background
He was born in Kuala Sepetang, Perak, Malaysia on November 30, 1958.

He was commissioned in the Royal Malay Regiment as a Second Lieutenant in 1978, and ever since, held various commands in the Army and Armed Forces, including as the Senior Staff Officer to the Chief of Defence Force in 2001, and Vice Chancellor of the National Defence University of Malaysia from September 2008 to May 2010.

He also attended various courses such as the Senior Development Programme at the John F. Kennedy School of Government, Harvard University, in Cambridge, Massachusetts, holds a Master in Management from the Asian Institute of Management at Makati, Philippines, obtained an Advanced Diploma in Business and Management (Distinction) from Swansea University, University of Wales, and a diploma from the Royal College of Defence Studies (Imperial Defence College) in London. He is also an Adjunct Professor to the Centre of Business Innovation and Technopreneurship, in the Universiti Malaysia Perlis since 2010, and appointed as Professor (Profesor Ikhtisas) by the National Defence University of Malaysia in 2017.

He was involved in the Communist insurgency, and served as a senior instructor at the Army Training Group and Senior Instructor at the New Zealand Army Infantry school of the New Zealand Army from 1986 to 1988, training the New Zealand Army and other Commonwealth armies in training weapons, tactics and counter insurgency warfare. He was also the Commandant of the Army Recruit Training Centre from 2002 to 2004, and was appointed as the Chief of the Malaysian Army from June 2011 to June 2013.

His interests include reading about Management (Defence, Training and Human Resources Management), Defence and Security Studies (Total Defence, Counter Insurgency and Terrorism), Leadership and Development subjects, as well as taking care of orchards, fishing and hunting.

He is married to Puan Sri Datin Seri Hajjah Rusnah binti Haji A. Rahman, and have four children, two sons and two daughters.

Post-career
After retiring from military service, Zulkifli continue life as civilian without anything holding any position GLC compared to other former Chief of Army.He do his daily activities such hunting,gardening and other.

However in 20th January 2023 Zulkifli was appointed as Chief Negotiations South Thailand insurgency to replace former 5th Inspector of General Police Tan Sri Abdul Rahim Mohd Noor who held the office a few years since 2008

Honours
 :
  Officer of the Order of the Defender of the Realm (KMN) (1996)
  Companion of the Order of Loyalty to the Crown of Malaysia (JSM) (2007)
  Commander of the Order of Meritorious Service (PJN) — Datuk (2011)
 Commander of the Order of Loyalty to the Crown of Malaysia (PSM) — Tan Sri (2012)
  Commander of the Order of the Defender of the Realm (PMN) — Tan Sri (2019)
 :
  Knight Commander of the Order of Taming Sari (DPTS) – Dato' Pahlawan (2007)
  Knight Grand Commander of the Order of Taming Sari (SPTS) – Dato' Seri Panglima (2012)
 :
  Grand Knight of the Order of the Crown of Pahang (SIMP) – Dato' Indera (2010)
  Knight Companion of the Order of Sultan Ahmad Shah of Pahang (DSAP) – Dato' (2011)
  Grand Knight of the Order of Sultan Ahmad Shah of Pahang (SSAP) – Dato' Sri (2012)
 :
  Knight Commander of the Glorious Order of the Crown of Kedah (DGMK) – Dato' Wira (2011)
  Knight Commander of the Order of Loyalty to Sultan Abdul Halim Mu'adzam Shah (DHMS) – Dato' Paduka (2012)
 :
  Commander of the Order of the Defender of State (DGPN) – Dato’ Seri (2012)
  Knight Commander of the Order of the Defender of State (DPPN) – Dato’ Seri (2018)
 :
  Knight Grand Commander of the Order of the Noble Crown of Kelantan (SPKK) – Dato' (2012)
 :
  Knight Commander of the Order of the Crown of Selangor (DPMS) – Dato’ (2012)
  Knight Grand Commander of the Order of the Crown of Selangor (SPMS) – Dato’ Seri (2018)
 :
  Grand Knight of the Order of Loyalty to Tuanku Muhriz (SSTM) – Dato' Seri (2013)
 :
  Knight Grand Commander of the Order of the Crown of Terengganu (SPMT) (2013)
 Malaysian Armed Forces :
  The Most Gallant Order of Military Service with the ranks of Courageous Commander (Darjah Panglima Gagah Angkatan Tentera/PGAT) and Warrior (Pahlawan Angkatan Tentera/PAT)
  Malaysian Service Medal
  General Service Medal

Foreign honours
:
 – The Most Exalted Order of Famous Valour 1st Cl – Darjah Paduka Keberanian Laila Terbilang Yang Amat Gemilang Darjah Pertama – (DPKT) which carries the title Dato Paduka Seri
:
 – Darjah Utama Bakti Cemerlang (Tentera) – (DUBC)
 :
 Honorary Airborne Wings - From The Royal Thai Army

References

People from Perak
1958 births
Living people
Malaysian military personnel
Officers of the Order of the Defender of the Realm
Companions of the Order of Loyalty to the Crown of Malaysia
Commanders of the Order of Meritorious Service
Commanders of the Order of Loyalty to the Crown of Malaysia
Commanders of the Order of the Defender of the Realm
Knights Commander of the Order of the Crown of Selangor
Knights Grand Commander of the Order of the Crown of Selangor
Knights Grand Commander of the Order of the Crown of Terengganu